Shittu Alao (born 1937 – 15 October 1969) was Nigerian Air Force's Chief of the Air Staff from 1967 to 1969. Colonel Shittu was the fourth Commander of the Nigerian Air Force (NAF), the second indigenous officer to hold the post.

Death
He died on October 15, 1969, in an air crash at Uzebba, about 50 miles northwest of Benin. He was aged 32 and he was alone in the plane. Two days later, in Lagos, he was buried with full military honours.

Emmanuel E Ikwue was announced as his replacement on December 18, 1969.

References
 

Nigerian Air Force officers
Living people
1937 births
Chiefs of the Air Staff (Nigeria)